Twins appear in the mythologies of many cultures around the world. In some cultures they are seen as ominous, and in others they are seen as auspicious. Twins in mythology are often cast as two halves of the same whole, sharing a bond deeper than that of ordinary siblings, or seen as fierce rivals. They can be seen as representations of a dualistic worldview. They can represent another aspect of the self, a doppelgänger, or a shadow. However, twins can also reflect a complete opposition of the other, such as the "civilized" Gilgamesh, and the "wild" Enkidu; or in the commonly known instance of good and evil twin identities.

Twins are often depicted with special powers. This applies to both mortal and immortal sets of twins, and often is related to power over the weather. Twins in mythology also often share deep bonds. In Greek mythology, Castor and Pollux share a bond so strong that when mortal Castor dies, Pollux gives up half of his immortality to be with his brother. Castor and Pollux are the Dioscuri twin brothers. Their mother is Leda, a being who was seduced by Zeus who had taken the form of a swan. Even though the brothers are twins, they have two different fathers. This phenomenon is a very common interpretation of twin births across different mythological cultures. Castor's father is Tyndareus, the king of Sparta (hence the mortal form). Pollux is the son of Zeus (demigod). This brothers were said to be born from an egg along with either sister Helen and Clytemnestra. This etymologically explains why their constellation, the Dioskouroi or Gemini, is only seen during one half of the year, as the twins split their time between the underworld and Mount Olympus. In an aboriginal tale, the same constellation represents the twin lizards who created the plants and animals and saved women from evil spirits. Another example of this strong bond shared between twins is the Ibeji twins from African mythology. Ibeji twins are viewed as one soul shared between two bodies. If one of the twins dies, the parents then create a doll that portrays the body of the deceased child, so the soul of the deceased can remain intact for the living twin. Without the creation of the doll, the living twin is almost destined for death because it is believed to be missing half of its soul. Twins in mythology are often associated with healing. They are also often gifted with the ability of divination or insight into the future.

Divine twins in twin mythology are identical to either one or both place of a god. The Feri gods are not separated entities but are unified into one center. These divine twins can function alone in one body, either functioning as a male or as male and female as they desire. Divine twins represent a polarity in the world. This polarity may be great or small and at times can be opposition. Twins are often seen to be rivals or adversaries.

By culture

Africa

Egyptian
 Nut and Geb, Dualistic twins. God of Earth (Geb) and Goddess of the sky (Nut)
 Osiris - Isis’ twin and husband. Lord of the underworld. First born of Geb and Nut. One of the most important gods of ancient Egypt.
Isis - Daughter of Geb and Nut; twin of Osiris.
Ausar - (also known by Macedonian Greeks as Osiris) twin of Set. Set tricked his brother at a banquet he organized so as to take his life.

Nigerian
 Mawu-Lisa - Twins representing moon and sun, respectively. Ewe-Fon culture. 
 Yemaja - Mother of all life on earth. Yoruba culture.
Aganju - Twin and husband of Yemaja
 Ibeji - Twins of joy and happiness. Children of Shango and Oshun.

Amerindian

 Gluskap and Malsumis - A cultural hero and its evil twin brother for the Wabanaki peoples. 
 Hahgwehdiyu and Hahgwehdaetgah - Sons of Iroquois sky goddess Atahensic.
 Asdzą́ą́ Nádleehé and Yolkai Estsan - Navajo goddesses.
 Monster Slayer and Born-for-Water - Navajo Hero Twins.
 Jukihú and Juracán - Twin sons of Atabex (Mother Nature), the personifications of Order and Chaos, respectively; from the Taíno Arawak nation which once stretched from South America through the Caribbean and up to Florida in the US. 
 Hun-apu and Ixbalanque, the Maya Hero Twins - Defeated the Seven Macaw
 Quetzalcoatl and Xolotl or Tezcatlipoca
Kokomaht and Bahotahl - Good and evil forces in nature.

Ancient Mesopotamian religion
 Inanna and Utu.

Greek and Roman mythology
 Divine
 Apollo and Artemis - God and goddess, children of Zeus and Leto
 Hypnos and Thanatos - Sons of Nyx and Erebos.
 Ploutos and Philomelos - Sons of Demeter and the demigod Iasion.
 Despoina and Arion - Goddess and immortal horse, children of Demeter and Poseidon.
 Palici - Sicilian chthonic deities in Greek mythology and Roman mythology.
 Romulus and Remus - Central characters of Rome's foundation myth. Children of Rhea Silvia by either the god Mars, or by the demi-god Hercules.
 One divine, one mortal
 Heracles and Iphicles - Though their mother was Alcmene, Hercules was son of Zeus while Iphicles was son of Amphitryon.
 Castor and Pollux, known as the Dioscuri - Though their mother was Leda, Castor was mortal son of Tyndareus, the king of Sparta, while Pollux was the divine son of Zeus.
 Helen and Clytemnestra - Sisters of the Dioscuri, they were the daughters of Leda by Zeus and Tyndareus, respectively.
 Children of a god or nymph and a mortal
 Atlas and Eumelus/Gadeirus, Ampheres and Evaemon, Mneseus and Autochthon, Elasippus and Mestor, and Azaes and Diaprepes - Five sets of twins, sons of Poseidon and Cleito, and Kings of Atlantis in Plato's myth.
 Belus and Agenor - Sons of Poseidon and Libya.
 Aegyptus and Danaus - Sons of Belus and Achiroe, a naiad daughter of Nile.
 Aeolus and Boeotus - Sons of Poseidon and Arne.
 Lycastus and Parrhasius - Sons of Ares and Phylonome, daughter of Nyctimus of Arcadia.
 Amphion and Zethus - Sons of Zeus by Antiope
 Centaurus and Lapithes - Sons of Ixion and Nephele or Apollo and Stilbe.
 Pelias and Neleus - Sons of Poseidon and Tyro.
 Phrixus and Helle - Children of Athamas and Nephele.
 Prometheus and Epimetheus - Sons of the Titan Iapetus and the Oceanid Clymene.
 Eurytus and Cteatus - Sons of Molione either by Actor or Poseidon
 Ascalaphus and Ialmenus - Sons of Ares and Astyoche, Argonauts who participated in the Trojan War.
 Mortal
 Kleobis and Biton - Sons of a Hera priestess in Argos
 Iasus and Pelasgus - Sons of Phoroneus or Triopas
 Proetus and Acrisius - Rival twins, children of Abas and Aglaea or Ocalea.
 Porphyrion and Ptous - Sons of Athamas and Themisto
 Thessalus and Alcimenes - Sons of Jason and Medea.
 Cassandra and Helenus - Children of King Priam and Queen Hecuba of Troy with prophetic powers.
 Procles and Eurysthenes - Great-great-great-grandsons of Heracles, sons of Aristodemus and Argia.
 Sisyphus and Salmoneus - Rivals who angered Zeus with their deceit and hubris. Sons of King Aeolus of Thessaly and Enarete.

Ancient Syria
 Arsu and Azizos - Gods of the evening star and morning star.

Norse mythology
 Freyr and Freyja - God and goddess, children of Njörðr.

Hinduism
 The Ashvins - Sons of the sun God, Surya. Represent dualities such as building and destroying.
 Koti and Chennayya - Twin heroes
 Yama and Yami - God and Goddess of death.
 Lava and Kusha - Children of Rama and Sita.
 Nakula and Sahadeva - sons of the last born of the Pandavas 
 Lakshmana and Shatrughna - Children of Dasharatha and Sumitra
Indra and Agni - Mirror twins

Jewish

 Jacob and Esau - Sons of Isaac and Rebekah. Represented two nations.
 Thomas the apostle and his unnamed twin brother.

Zoroastrian

 Ahura Mazda and Ahriman - Twins of opposing forces: good and evil.

Ossetian mythology 

 Akhshar and Akhsartag - one of the main characters and progenitors of the Nart saga

Afro-Caribbean cosmologies
 Marassa Jumeaux - The divine, children twins in Vodou.
 Ibeji - Twins of joy and happiness. Children of Chango and Oshun.

Asia 

 Izanagi and Izanami - God and Goddess, creators of the Japanese islands.

See also
 Divine twins

 Dualistic cosmology

References

Selected literature
 
 
 
"Ahura Mazda (Ohrmazd) and Ahriman." New Catholic Encyclopedia. . Encyclopedia.com.12 Dec. 2018 <https://www.encyclopedia.com>.
“ISIS.” Egyptian Mythology for Smart People, egyptianmythology.org/gods-and-goddesses/isis/.
Lewin, Vivienne. Twin Enigma. Karnac Books, 2017.
Myers, Bethany. “Southern Illinois University Carbondale OpenSIUC.” Southern Illinois University Carbondale OpenSIUC, 2002, opensiuc.lib.siu.edu/cgi/viewcontent.cgi?referer=https://www.google.com/&httpsredir=1&article=1005&context=uhp_theses.
Voth, Grant, et al., directors. The Beauty of African Mythology. Welcome to Virginia Commonwealth University | Kanopy, 2015, vcu.kanopy.com/s?query=african+mythology.

Further reading
 Carvalho, Sílvia Maria Schmuziger de; Ralle, Elena (traducteur). "Soleil et Lune: les jumeaux mythiques et le caractère tricheur". In: Les grandes figures religieuses: fonctionnement pratique et symbolique dans l'Antiquité. Actes du Colloque international (Besançon, 25-26 avril 1984) Besançon: Université de Franche-Comté, 1986. pp. 159-164. (Annales littéraires de l'Université de Besançon, 329) [www.persee.fr/doc/ista_0000-0000_1986_act_329_1_1673]
 Hankoff L. D. (1977). "Why the healing gods are twins". In: The Yale journal of biology and medicine 50(3): 307–319.
 Harris, James Rendel. The Cult of the Heavenly Twins. Cambridge: University Press. 1906.
 Rachewiltz, B., Parisi, P., & Castellani, V. (1976). "Twins in Myth". In: Acta Geneticae Medicae Et Gemellologiae, 25(1): 17-19. doi:10.1017/S0001566000013751

Mythological archetypes
Mythology